Čakov is name of several locations in the Czech Republic:
Čakov (Benešov District)
Čakov (České Budějovice District)